Mark Rowsom (born 1959 in Comber, Ontario) is a Canadian former pair skater. With his skating partner, Cynthia Coull, he became the 1986 World bronze medallist, 1986 Skate Canada International champion, and a three-time national champion (1985–1987).

Results
pairs with Coull

References
pairsonice

Navigation

Canadian male pair skaters
Living people
1959 births
World Figure Skating Championships medalists
20th-century Canadian people
21st-century Canadian people